MC-12 may refer to:
 a coach/bus manufactured by Motor Coach Industries
 the military version of the Beechcraft C-12 Huron
 the automobile, Maserati MC12